The Jordanshöhe is a mountain, roughly , in the Harz in central Germany. It lies north of the town of Sankt Andreasberg in the district of Goslar in Lower Saxony. To the west is the Kuppe. On the mountain there is the Jordanshöhe youth hostel and the Jordanshöhe nature trail (Gesteinskundlichen Lehrpfad Jordanshöhe).

References 

Mountains of the Harz
Mountains under 1000 metres
Mountains of Lower Saxony